The 1950–51 Scottish Division A was won by Hibernian by ten points over nearest rival Rangers. Clyde and Falkirk finished 15th and 16th respectively and were relegated to the 1951–52 Scottish Division B.

League table

Results

References

Scottish Football Archive

1950–51 Scottish Football League
Scottish Division One seasons
Scot